Mimoxylamia gentyi is a species of beetle in the family Cerambycidae, and the only species in the genus Mimoxylamia. It was described by Breuning in 1977.

References

Lamiini
Beetles described in 1977